The 2009–10 season was French football club Paris Saint-Germain's 37th professional season, their 37th season in Ligue 1 and their 36th consecutive season in French top-flight. PSG was managed by Antoine Kombouaré. The club was chaired by Robin Leproux. Paris Saint-Germain was present in the Ligue 1, the Coupe de France and the Coupe de la Ligue. Paris Saint-Germain's average home gate was 33,266, the fourth highest in Ligue 1.

A few weeks before the end of his short term as president of Paris Saint-Germain, Sébastien Bazin, chair of the club's supervisory board and head of Colony Capital in Europe, assigned a clear goal for the capital club, especially to Robin Leproux, the future president of the club, and Antoine Kombouaré, the new manager. Bazin stated his expectations from the upcoming managerial tenure of former PSG player Antoine Kombouaré, as well as revealing his reasons for not making Alain Roche director of football. He also considered that Colony Capital, PSG's majority shareholder, was not behind in its development plan of the club, three years after its partial takeover. The U.S. investment firm had envisioned a six-year development plan to transform Paris Saint-Germain into an economically profitable and successful football club. Bazin declared that PSG started the season with the prospect of regaining European status:

News 
Paris Saint-Germain and Valenciennes reached a final agreement which allowed Antoine Kombouaré to join as first team coach for the next three seasons with an option for a fourth. Zoumana Camara signed a new one-year contract extension until 2012. Loris Arnaud signed a new two-year contract extension until 2012. Nicolas Dehon replaced Christian Mas as goalkeeping coach. Yves Bertucci committed to Paris Saint-Germain for one year as Antoine Kombouaré's assistant coach. Guillaume Hoarau signed an extension to his current contract until 2013. Colony Capital acquired all the shares of Morgan Stanley and became 95% owners of Paris Saint-Germain. Claude Makélélé signed a new one-year contract extension until 2010. Stéphane Sessègnon signed a one-year contract until 2013. Ceará penned a new deal until 2012. Sylvain Armand signed a new deal until 2012. PSG president Sébastien Bazin announced that Robin Leproux joined the club's board of directors. Péguy Luyindula signed a new two-year contract extension until 2012. Robin Leproux replaced Sébastien Bazin and became the new president of Paris Saint-Germain. Granddi Ngoyi penned a new three-year deal until 2013. Paris mayor Bertrand Delanoë announced that the Parc des Princes would be renovated to host the UEFA Euro 2016.

The club launched the Passion PSG membership, a relationship program unique in French football to strengthen the sense of community among their supporters. Younousse Sankharé signed a two-year extension until 2012. Paris Saint-Germain's eagerly-anticipated encounter with Olympique de Marseille was postponed after two club players had contracted swine flu. Ludovic Giuly and Mamadou Sakho were the first to be infected, before Jérémy Clément picked up the H1N1 virus. Robin Leproux announced his intentions of reviving the Tournoi de Paris for the 2010–11 season on the occasion of the club's 40th Anniversary. Claude Makélélé announced his retirement from professional football at the end of the season. Yann L., a Paris Saint-Germain fan injured in a fight between rival factions of hooligans from the club, was left in a life-threatening coma ahead of the league match between fierce rivals PSG and Marseille. The clashes involved hooligans from the two main stands at the Parc des Princes, the Tribune d'Auteuil and the Kop of Boulogne. Boulogne Boys member Yann L. was attacked by another PSG group, the Supras Auteuil.

OM fans had boycotted the match to protest against security measures imposed on visiting supporters. After several months of relative tranquility, Boulogne and Auteuil fans, angered by their team's poor results and a mutual opposition to the club's chief backer, Colony Capital, started fighting again at the end of last year and clashed violently at Lille in January. Robin Leproux reported the club would not make available tickets to their fans for away games until further notice. Yann L. died in the hospital after being in a coma since 28 February. The LFP announced that PSG would play their next three fixtures behind closed doors. Laurent Perpère and Francis Graille, two former presidents of Paris Saint-Germain, were handed suspended jail sentences and fines over a series of suspect transfers between 1998 and 2003. Perpère was given an 18-month suspended sentence and a 40,000-euros fine, while Graille received a one-year suspended sentence and a €20,000 fine. They set up the illegal scheme which included players, agents and Nike France. Nike France and PSG were respectively fined €120,000 and €150,000 for their part in the operation.

French Prime Minister François Fillon and Interior Minister Brice Hortefeux disbanded five PSG ultras supporters groups in light of the violence at the Parc des Princes. From the Tribune d'Auteuil, the groups Supras Auteuil 1991, Paris 1970 la Grinta and Les Authentiks were dissolved. At the other end of the pitch, the Kop of Boulogne lost Commando Loubard and Milice Paris. Once again, however, it was unclear how this would result in anything different regarding violence in the stands. Technically, the Boulogne Boys were banned in 2008, but most of their members have simply infiltrated other groups in the Kop of Boulogne. The Tournoi de Paris was officially confirmed for 2010. Tribune de Auteuil supporters called for a "peaceful march" in protest against the new anti-violence plan which was being set up by the club management. The majority shareholder of PSG and the supervisory board of the club extended the tenure of president Robin Leproux until 2013. The LFP announced the classification of training centers for the 2009–10 season. Paris Saint-Germain was ranked 11th, but at the forefront of the list regarding the selection of club-grown players.

Transfers 
In

Total spending:  €16.2 million

Out

Total income:  €5.48 million

Squad information

Kit 
Nike manufactured the kits for Paris Saint-Germain and Emirates Airlines continued to be the club's main sponsor. Nike have been PSG's official kit provider since 1989. Emirates have been the club's partner since 2005 and the major shirt sponsor since January 2006. PSG were handed brand new home and away kits. The home shirt was mainly PSG's traditional home colours of Navy Blue. Red pinstripes ran down the shirt and sleeves. The collar and ends of the sleeves were red, dropping the club's 'historical' shirt and causing some controversy amongst the fans, as it strayed away from the more traditional blue shirt with a central red vertical stripe trimmed with white. The away shirt was mostly white. The shirt featured a blue and red polkadott pattern around the whole shirt. There was a red piping around the ends of the sleeves and collars. The shirts had the club badge on the top-left, the Nike logo on the top-right and the club sponsor Fly Emirates written across the middle.

Board and staff

Friendly matches 
Just like last season, Paris Saint-Germain opened their pre-season campaign with a victory over Pontivy. Christophe Jallet and Grégory Coupet both made their debuts in the famous red and blue colours. PSG encountered few problems against Nantes, relegated from the French top-flight last season, with defender Sammy Traoré nodding "Les Parisiens" in front from a Clément Chantôme free-kick before Serbian striker Mateja Kežman made sure of victory shortly before half-time. Just two weeks before the start of the Ligue 1 season, PSG continued their pre-season preparation with a draw against a physical Greek side from Panthrakikos. Invited by Italian outfit Fiorentina, PSG attended the Memorial Artemio Franchi and stole the show scoring three unanswered goals, including Mevlüt Erdinç's first goal for new club Paris Saint-Germain, confirming that Antoine Kombouaré's squad was in tip top form just ten days from the start of the campaign. Paris attended Arsenal's Emirates Cup for the second time and suffered their first of the pre-season at the hands of Rangers in their opening match. New striker Mevlüt Erdinç, a 10 million signing from Sochaux, spurned a host of first-half chances for "Les Parisiens", who found themselves on the back foot for much of the first period. Paris Saint-Germain showed great character in coming back to equalize while playing a man down against Atlético Madrid in the second day of the tournament. The pre-season lived up to all its promise and was certainly a positive outing for Antoine Kombouaré's side.

Paris Saint-Germain prepared for the trip to Marseille in style with a win over Portuguese leaders Sporting Braga. The match was notable for Zoumana Camara gracing the Parc des Princes for the first time in the season after recovering from phlebitis. Clément Chantôme scored the opening two PSG goals and laid on an assist for Yannick Boli to add a late third. PSG was involved in a friendly match ahead of French Cup action, the men from the capital doing their coach proud with four unanswered goals against Ligue 2 side Vannes. Ludovic Giuly broke the deadlock and Vannes's Patrick Leugueun scored an own goal before Jean-Eudes Maurice added a third. Mevlüt Erdinç rounded out the scoring. Paris Saint-Germain announced their participation in the Chicago Sister Cities International Cup. After a season in which they disappointed in Ligue 1 but won the French Cup for the eighth time, Antoine Kombouaré's side flew to New York City for a short visit before heading to Chicago for the tournament against Legia Warsaw, Red Star Belgrade and hosts Chicago Fire. A narrow win against Chicago Fire took them through to a final meeting with Serbian league runners-up Red Star Belgrade. Paris Saint-Germain brought the curtain down on their end-of-season US tour with a defeat on penalties against Red Star Belgrade in the final of the Sister Cities Cup.

Competitions

Ligue 1 

An injury-time goal from Emir Spahić earned 10-man new boys Montpellier a dramatic draw at home to Paris Saint-Germain on the opening day of the season. Antoine Kombouaré's men notched their first win against Le Mans thanks to goals from Mevlüt Erdinç and Ludovic Giuly. Paris Saint-Germain coach Antoine Kombouaré made a winning return to former club Valenciennes as his side took all three points. Paris Saint-Germain kept themselves up with Ligue 1's leading pack with a home win over struggling Lille. In a frenetic final ten minutes that saw two goals and the expulsion of PSG's Stéphane Sessègnon, AS Monaco secured a dramatic win over the capital club at the Stade Louis II. Substitute Bafétimbi Gomis swooped to grab an equalizer five minutes from time as Olympique Lyonnais maintained their unbeaten start to the season with a draw at Paris Saint-Germain. Guillaume Hoarau found the net for the first time this season as Paris Saint-Germain picked up a point with a draw at Lorient. Paris Saint-Germain's bright start to the season is now a fading memory as Antoine Kombouaré's men stuttered to a third successive league draw as they were held by Nancy. Albin Ebondo's strike was enough for hosts Toulouse to edge out Paris Saint-Germain. Mevlüt Erdinç returned to former club Sochaux and scored PSG's third but also missed a first-half penalty as the capital club won for the first time since Week 4. A late goal on the counter-attack from Loïc Rémy allowed Nice to snatch three points from their trip to face Paris Saint-Germain. Gabriel Heinze's header was enough for Olympique de Marseille to take the honours in the rescheduled Clasico, dominating a struggling Paris Saint-Germain to climb to fourth place.

Auxerre's winning run was ended at seven after Jérémy Clément gave Paris Saint-Germain all three points at the Parc des Princes. Paris Saint-Germain scored four times in the space of nine minutes after the break on their way to a win over struggling Boulogne. Bordeaux stretched their lead at the top of Ligue 1 to four points with a victory over Paris Saint-Germain after Jaroslav Plašil headed home Benoît Trémoulinas's cross. A scintillating first-half display from Paris Saint-Germain gave them a win over Saint-Étienne to compound "Les Verts'" current problems. Lens came away from the French capital with a valuable point after holding Paris Saint-Germain to a draw with both goals coming in a frenetic four-minute spell in the second-half. Ismaël Bangoura's strike was enough for Rennes to convert their domination over Paris into three points and climb to provisional fourth place on the Ligue 1 table. A strong Paris Saint-Germain side piled more misery on Grenoble at the Parc des Princes, but the scoreline was harsh on a visiting side that were on top for long spells and hit the woodwork twice. Lille romped to a seventh successive Ligue 1 victory in their win over Paris Saint-Germain. An own goal from 'keeper Apoula Edel handed a precious three points to Monaco when the two sides fought out a frenetic league encounter at the Parc des Princes. Mevlüt Erdinç fired Paris Saint-Germain in front but Mamadou Sakho's red card changed everything and Bafétimbi Gomis and Cris struck Lyon's second half goals. Lorient improved their already impressive record in the capital as they outclassed struggling Paris Saint-Germain to condemn their hosts to a fourth successive league defeat. Antoine Kombouaré's men managed to avoid a fifth consecutive league loss as they drew in Nancy in a cagey match that saw both sides taking no risks in the search of a winner. Guillaume Hoarau scored for the first time since September as Paris Saint-Germain recorded a morale-boosting win over ten-man Toulouse at the Parc des Princes. Marseille enjoyed their biggest ever win at the Parc des Princes over Paris Saint-Germain.

Stéphane Sessègnon popped up four minutes into injury time to snatch a draw for troubled Paris Saint-Germain at Lens, after Sébastien Roudet's strike was set to hand the hosts all three points. Mevlüt Erdinç gave the striking Paris fans something to sing about as his hat-trick against former club Sochaux led PSG to a comprehensive win at the Parc des Princes. Loïc Rémy's late strike proved enough for Nice to beat Paris Saint-Germain behind closed doors at the Stade du Ray. Paris Saint-Germain were playing their third match in a week behind closed doors, but they made light work of ten-man Boulogne at the Parc des Princes. Auxerre missed out on the opportunity to ease clear of their title rivals at the top of the Ligue 1 table as they were held by a battling Paris Saint-Germain side. Bordeaux suffered a second major setback in a week, beaten at Paris Saint-Germain after veteran back-up goalkeeper Ulrich Ramé was sent off. Defence was the order of the day as a new-look PSG line-up managed a scoreless draw with a 17th-placed Saint-Étienne side. Paris Saint-Germain had to settle for a point at the Parc des Princes after the woodwork came to Rennes' rescue three times in the latter stages. Grenoble thumped Cup finalists Paris Saint-Germain at the Stade des Alpes with two goals in each half. Mateja Kežman's late strike looked to have secured all three points for PSG against Valenciennes, but Fahid Ben Khalfallah's reply a minute later rescued the draw. Ligue 2-bound Le Mans recorded their first-ever home victory over Paris Saint-Germain in the top-flight thanks to an early own-goal from Sylvain Armand. Montpellier booked a Europa League spot with a win at the Parc des Princes, while PSG finished 13th.

League table

Results summary

Results by round

Coupe de France 

Paris Saint-Germain entered the French Cup at the round of 64, as all Ligue 1 clubs did. Paris was pitted against fifth tier club Aubervilliers. Despite strong local support for CFA 2 side Aubervilliers, the Parisian French Cup derby was a one-sided affair, Paris running riot at the Parc des Princes. Despite many of the weekend's French Cup matches being postponed due to the cold snap in France, the draw for the round of 32 was held and Paris Saint-Germain hosted National side Évian at the Parc des Princes. Paris Saint-Germain qualified for the last-16 of the French Cup with a win over courageous Évian at the Parc des Princes. Mevlüt Erdinç scored twice with Guillaume Hoarau netting the third. The draw for the round of 16 of the French Cup was effected and PSG was pitted away to fourth tier club Vesoul. Paris Saint-Germain put their current league troubles behind them, continuing their winning ways in the French Cup with a narrow win in a heated affair away to CFA side Vesoul to advance to the quarter-finals. The quarter-finals of the French Cup were drawn, with the pick of the bunch being Auxerre's playing host to Paris Saint-Germain. Paris Saint-Germain pulled off a dramatic win, 6–5 on penalties over Auxerre after extra time ended scoreless to book a place in the semi-finals. CFA amateurs Quevilly got their reward for knocking out Boulogne as they were drawn at home to Paris Saint-Germain, who eliminated Auxerre. Paris Saint-Germain booked their place in the French Cup Final against AS Monaco in the French Cup Final after ending amateur side Quevilly's stunning campaign with a narrow victory in Caen, top scorer Mevlüt Erdinç scoring the only goal of a lively cup encounter. Guillaume Hoarau's extra-time strike was enough to claim PSG's eighth French Cup title in a hard-fought final against Monaco, whose coach Guy Lacombe failed at the final French Cup hurdle for the second year running, at the Stade de France.

Coupe de la Ligue 

The League Cup draw for the third round was held and threw up no less than six all-Ligue 1 ties, including Paris Saint-Germain's trip to Boulogne. Jean-Eudes Maurice scored the goal that separated the two Ligue 1 sides on the hour. Boulogne had several chances but could not beat veteran goalkeeper Grégory Coupet. Midfielder Clément Chantôme hit the post for PSG late on. PSG travelled to French Cup holders Guingamp for the last-16. PSG quit the League Cup after they lost their last-16 clash away to Guingamp. The Brittany outfit won courtesy of a Mamadou Sakho own goal.

Start formations 

Starting XI

Appearances and goals 

|}

Other statistics 
{| class="sortable" border="2" cellpadding="4" cellspacing="0" style="text-align:left; margin: 1em 1em 1em 0; background: #f9f9f9; border: 1px #aaa solid; border-collapse: collapse; font-size: 95%;"
|-
!class="sortable" width="50px"|No.
!width="50px"|Pos.
!class="sortable" width="50px"|Nat.
!width="150px"|Player
!class="sortable" width="50px"| Assists
!width="100px"|Minutes Played
!class="sortable" width="50px"|
!width="50px"|
|-
|1 || GK ||  || Grégory Coupet || 0 || 1523 || 0 || 0
|----
|16 || GK ||  || Willy Grondin || 0 || 29 || 0 || 0
|----
|30 || GK ||  || Apoula Edel || 0 || 2588 || 1 || 0
|----
|2 || DF ||  || Ceará || 2 || 2760 || 1 || 0
|----
|3 || DF ||  || Mamadou Sakho || 1 || 3456 || 7 || 1
|----
|6 || DF ||  || Grégory Bourillon || 0 || 328 || 1 || 0
|----
|13 || DF ||  || Sammy Traoré || 0 || 2072 || 4 || 0
|----
|15 || DF ||  || Zoumana Camara || 0 || 2617 || 5 || 0
|----
|22 || DF ||  || Sylvain Armand || 1 || 3416 || 4 || 0
|----
|26 || DF ||  || Christophe Jallet || 8 || 3014 || 2 || 0
|----
|4 || MF ||  || Claude Makélélé || 2 || 3136 || 9 || 0
|----
|10 || MF ||  || Stéphane Sessègnon || 5 || 2692 || 4 || 2
|----
|12 || MF ||  || Albert Baning || 0 || 10 || 0 || 0
|----
|17 || MF ||  || Granddi Ngoyi || 0 || 1070 || 4 || 0
|----
|20 || MF ||  || Clément Chantôme || 1 || 1310 || 4 || 0
|----
|23 || MF ||  || Jérémy Clément || 1 || 3491 || 8 || 0
|----
|24 || MF ||  || Tripy Makonda || 0 || 180 || 0 || 0
|----
|25 || MF ||  || Jérôme Rothen || 0 || 0 || 0 || 0
|-----
|27 || MF ||  || Younousse Sankharé || 3 || 971 || 4 || 0
|----
|7 || FW ||  || Ludovic Giuly || 3 || 2474 || 1 || 0
|----
|8 || FW ||  || Péguy Luyindula || 2 || 2287 || 1 || 0
|----
|9 || FW ||  || Guillaume Hoarau || 2 || 2067 || 5 || 0
|----
|11 || FW ||  || Mevlüt Erdinç || 2 || 2834 || 4 || 0
|----
|14 || FW ||  || Mateja Kežman || 1 || 420 || 4 || 0
|----
|18 || FW ||  || Loris Arnaud || 0 || 8 || 0 || 0
|----
|21 || FW ||  || Jean-Eudes Maurice || 3 || 736 || 0 || 0

References

External links 

Official Websites
  PSG.fr
  Paris Saint-Germain at Ligue 1
  Paris Saint-Germain at UEFA

News Sites
  Paris Saint-Germain News from Le Parisien
  Paris Saint-Germain News from L'Equipe
  Paris Saint-Germain News from Sky Sports
  Paris Saint-Germain News from ESPN

2009-10
French football clubs 2009–10 season